The 2007/08 NTFL season was the 87th season of the Northern Territory Football League (NTFL).

St Marys have won there 26th premiership title while defeating Waratah in the grand final by 96 points.

Grand Final

References

Northern Territory Football League seasons
NTFL